Horithyatira diehli is a moth in the family Drepanidae. It is found in Indonesia (Sumatra) and India (Assam).

References

Moths described in 1966
Thyatirinae